Rosen aus dem Süden (Roses From the South), Op. 388, is a waltz medley composed by Johann Strauss II in 1880 with its themes drawn from the operetta Das Spitzentuch der Königin (The Queen's Lace Handkerchief). Strauss dedicated the waltz to King Umberto I of Italy.

The waltz was first performed at the regular Sunday concerts of the Strauss Orchestra conducted by Eduard Strauss on 7 November 1880 at the Musikverein in Vienna. Its themes drawn from the operetta are the act 1 "Trüffel-Couplet" and the act 2 romance "Wo die wilde Rose erblüht" ("Where the Wild Rose Blossoms"). The act 2 romance most certainly inspired the title of this waltz.

The waltz ranks among the "Waltz King's" magnificent works and is still regularly performed today at the Vienna Philharmonic's New Year's Concert. The general mood of the piece is rather pensive but the final moments of the piece are utter joy and sparkling with Strauss happier tunes. Waltz section 1 is in F major and is graceful but pensive in mood. Waltz 2A is also in a more reflective mood but waltz 2B is more uplifting. The entire waltz 3 section is in G major while waltz section 4 is in E-flat major and has the climax with cymbals. A restless-sounding coda in E flat is soon replaced with a reprise of the waltz 3A. Waltz 1A has a brief show at the end before the waltz 4B is introduced, this time in the home key of F major. A series of descending chords marks the end of the waltz, underlined with a drum roll and final flourish.

Arnold Schoenberg arranged this waltz as part of a special concert for his Society for Private Musical Performances in 1921.

Fans of Star Trek will recognize "Roses from the South" as the waltz Trelane has Uhura play in "The Squire of Gothos". The song is also used in the Dancing with the Stars videogame for PlayStation 2, in the carnival sequence of "Sunrise: A Song of Two Humans," and finally in "Sophie's Choice," when Sophie is asked for her hand in marriage.

The waltz appears uncredited in the dance scene in the 2012 film The Dark Knight Rises starring Christian Bale and Michael Caine.

Instrumentation 
The waltz is scored for an orchestra of 2 flutes (2nd doubling piccolo), 2 oboes, 2 clarinets in C, 2 bassoons, 4 horns in F, 2 trumpets in F, 3 trombones, timpani, snare drum, triangle, bass drum, cymbals, harp, and strings.

References

External links
 

Waltzes by Johann Strauss II
1880 compositions
Music dedicated to nobility or royalty